Fernando Marcelo Balda Flores (born 3 August 1971) is an Ecuadorian politician.

Politics 
Balda stated that he had been abducted in July 2012 in Bogotá, Colombia, to which he had fled because in 2009, he had dropped his support for the Ecuadorian government, had changed from being a member of parliament for Alianza País to an opposition member of the Patriotic Society Party, and had been accused of involvement in a failed coup in 2010. Balda was deported from Colombia to Ecuador in October 2012 to serve a prison sentence. As of 2019, Ecuador is asking for its former president Rafael Correa to be extradited from Belgium for involvement in the purported abduction.

Balda signed the Madrid Charter, a document drafted by the right-wing Spanish party Vox that describes left-wing groups as enemies of Ibero-America involved in a "criminal project" that are "under the umbrella of the Cuban regime".

Sofía Espín who was a delegate for the Citizen Revolution, visited, Jéssica Falcón, a person in prison who was involved with the kidnap of Balda. It was said that she and lawyer, Yadira Cadena, made an offer of legal assistance, money and political asylum, in Belgium, to Balda is she was willing to retract her evidence in the Balda case. Espin was investigated and dismissed from the National Assembly in November 2018 with a majority of 94 votes. Espin herself went into exile.

Personal life 
Balda is married and has four children.

References

Ecuadorian politicians
Living people
1971 births
Signers of the Madrid Charter